Vegas Red Rooster is a  swingers club located in Whitney, Nevada in the Las Vegas Valley. The club hosted the after party for the annual Lifestyles Convention in Las Vegas.  The Red Rooster is a member of NASCA International.

History 
The Red Rooster was founded in 1982 and consisted of an  space.  The Rooster is the oldest swingers club in the Las Vegas area.

References

External links 

Whitney, Nevada
Tourist attractions in the Las Vegas Valley
Swinging (sexual practice)
1982 establishments in Nevada